Michelle Sheetz (born February 9, 1970), better known as Danni Leigh, is an American country music singer. At age 19, she relocated to Orlando, Florida, intending to audition as a singer at Disney World, but ended up moving to Nashville, Tennessee, in 1994.

She was signed with Audium Records, after changing labels several times, following Decca's closure, and her by Sony's Monument label. Although she has limited success in the US, she has had more success in Europe due to the different methods consumers learn about new music. Over time, she has also developed a following in Korea, Brazil, and Japan. In 1999, she was nominated for the Rising Star Trophy, a British Country Music Award. In 2001, she released A Shot of Whiskey and a Prayer.

Leigh has also performed a number of small gigs in the Austin, Texas, area, where she moved in 2002.

As her career declined in the US, Leigh later moved again, this time to Spain, many years later and performed elsewhere in Europe and Asia. She even reached the rest of South America. During the tours, she met and eventually married her bandmate Mike McKenzie. The couple returned to Nashville in order to restart her career, but the birth of her only child, a son, in 2010 led her to emphasize both motherhood and becoming a businessperson. Leigh then moved with her husband back to Strasburg, Virginia, her birthplace, where she started her boutique-cum-fitness studio in 2018 and opened another in Winchester.

Discography

Albums

Singles

Music videos

As guest musician
 2000: Billy Ray Cyrus - Southern Rain (Monument)
 2001: Dale Watson - Christmas in Texas (Audium)

References

External links
Danni Leigh official site
 
 

1970 births
American women country singers
American country singer-songwriters
American women in business
Businesspeople from Virginia
Country musicians from Virginia
Decca Records artists
MNRK Music Group artists
Living people
Monument Records artists
People from Strasburg, Virginia
Singer-songwriters from Virginia
21st-century American singers
21st-century American women singers